Jaba Mujiri (born 7 June 1980 in Tbilisi) is a Georgian football player who most recently plays for Foolad F.C. in the Iran Pro League before being fired from team. He usually plays in the defender position.

Club career
He returned to Iran for 2009–10 season to play for Foolad and was one of the regular players of the team.

Club career statistics
Last Update 14 March 2012 

 Assist Goals

Awards and honours

Georgian championship: 1
2003/04, FC WIT Georgia
Iranian Cup: 2
2005/06, Sepahan
2006/07, Sepahan

External links
FIFA profile
Football-Lineups.com

Expatriate footballers in Iran
Footballers from Georgia (country)
1980 births
Living people
Foolad FC players
Sepahan S.C. footballers
Association football defenders